Bill Parker may refer to:
Bill Parker (comics) (1911–1963), American comic book writer, created Captain Marvel in 1940
Bill Parker (inventor), artist and inventor of the plasma lamp
Bill Parker (Neighbours), fictional character on the Australian soap opera, Neighbours

See also
Billy Parker (disambiguation)
William Parker (disambiguation)